DP World is an Emirati multinational logistics company based in Dubai, United Arab Emirates. It specialises in cargo logistics, port terminal operations, maritime services and free trade zones. Formed in 2005 by the merger of Dubai Ports Authority and Dubai Ports International, DP World handles 70 million containers that are brought in by around 70,000 vessels annually. This equates to roughly 10% of global container traffic accounted for by their 82 marine and inland terminals present in over 40 countries. Until 2016, DP World was primarily a global ports operator, and since then it has acquired other companies up and down the value chain.

History

Early history
Dubai Ports International (DPI) was founded in 1999. Its first project was at Jeddah, Saudi Arabia, collaborating with a local partner on the management and operation of the South Container Terminal (SCT). DPI then went on to develop operations at the ports of Djibouti in 2000, Vizag, India in 2002 and Constanta, Romania in 2003. In January 2005, DPI acquired CSX World Terminals (CSX WT). It was later, in September 2005 that Dubai Ports International officially merged with the Dubai Ports Authority to form DP World. The rapid expansion through acquisition continued in March 2006 when DP World purchased the fourth largest ports operator in the world, P&O for £3.9 billion.

2006: US Port security controversy

The ownership of various US ports by DP World (which had been acquired as part of the P&O deal) was seen as highly controversial by many in the United States even though it was supported by the US president George W. Bush; the US ports were sold shortly afterwards.

P&O operated major US port facilities in New York, New Jersey, Philadelphia, Baltimore, New Orleans, and Miami. Before the deal was secured, the arrangement was reviewed by the Committee on Foreign Investment in the United States headed by the US Treasury Department and including the Departments of State, Commerce, and Homeland Security. It was given the green light, but soon after, both Democratic and Republican members of Congress expressed concern over the potential negative impact the deal would have on port security.

On 22 February 2006, President George W. Bush threatened to veto any legislation passed by Congress to block the deal, which would be the first time in his presidency he would exercise the privilege. In a statement to reporters, Bush claimed, "It would send a terrible signal to friends and allies not to let this transaction go through." On 23 February 2006, DP World volunteered to postpone its takeover of significant operations at the seaports and on 9 March 2006, is said that it would transfer its operations of American ports to a "US entity".

The United States House of Representatives held a vote on 16 March 2006 on legislation that would have blocked the DP World deal, with 348 members voting for blocking the deal, and 71 voting against. DP World later sold P&O's American operations to American International Group's asset management division, Global Investment Group for an undisclosed sum.

In August 2006, DP World signed an agreement with the Port Qasim Authority, to invest in a new container terminal at Port Muhammad Qasim near Karachi and announced that it was in discussions with the Pakistani Government about the development of a container terminal at Gwadar in Balochistan. DP World had been favourite to win the Gwadar concession, but withdrew from the bidding. Gwadar Port was subsequently awarded to PSA (Port of Singapore Authority) and opened in March 2007.

2007–2010: NASDAQ Dubai listing
In June 2007 the company raised $3.25 billion in Islamic and conventional bond sales to refinance existing debt and fund expansion and issued 3.818 billion shares, representing 20% of the company on the NASDAQ Dubai stock exchange in November 2007 in what was the Middle East's largest initial public offering (IPO) which raised 4.96 billion dollars.

By 2008 the company was handing 46.8 million TEU worldwide, up 8% on 2007, with expansion and development projects in India, China, the Middle East, and elsewhere. Capacity was expected to rise to around 95 million TEU over the next ten years.

In December 2009 Moody's downgraded DP World's financial status to junk after the Dubai 2009 debt standstill.

2010–2022: Covid-19 & corporate rebrand 

In the second quarter of 2010 DP World gave the go-ahead for construction of the £1.5 billion London Gateway port. Work started in February 2010 with the port due to open in the fourth quarter of 2013. By April 2011, Moody's upgraded DP World's financial status to 'investment grade'. Since December 2010, DP World has undertaken a series of asset disposals, exiting markets where it does not have a significant presence and seeking to redeploy funds in fast-growing markets.

On 20 February 2019, DP World announced it had repurchased P&O Ferries from Dubai World in a £322m deal.

In March 2021, the company said that, due to the COVID-19 pandemic, it had witnessed a drop of its profits by 29% comparing to 2019.

In May 2021, Abdulla Bin Damithan was appointed as CEO and managing director of UAE business.

In October 2021, coinciding with the launch of Expo 2020, DP World unveiled its new corporate identity. DP World is an official premier partner of Expo 2020.

2022: UK mass redundancy scandal 

On 17 March 2022, P&O Ferries sacked its entire British work force and abruptly suspended its operations, cancelling all sailings and offloading passengers and cargo. Eight hundred UK staff were told in a video call that their employment was "terminated with immediate effect due to redundancy", and that their work would in future be undertaken by staff contracted to a third-party supplier. A  spokesman for the National Union of Rail, Maritime and Transport Workers said that there had been no consultation with the staff or trade unions. Staff on some ferries refused to leave their vessels. Some replacement staff, unaware of the circumstances or location of their deployment, declined to work, and a recruitment agency who supplied replacement staff said that they were unaware of the plans.

The method of the expulsion, overseen by ex-military security guards, has been criticised by government and business leaders, and Mark Russell, a non-executive director of DP World, resigned afterwards in disagreement. P&O Ferries had recently seen losses during the COVID-19 pandemic as well as deficits in its pension fund. Industry sources have also cited its high overheads and competition from Irish Ferries as contributory factors. Verity Slater, expert in maritime employment law at Stephens Scown, commented that P&O may not have to follow UK employment laws, since some of its ships are not registered in Britain.

Location of DP World's operations 

DP World has a portfolio of 78 operating marine and inland terminals supported by over 50 related businesses in 40 countries across six continents.

The table below lists current terminals and new developments managed by DP World.

Corporate affairs

Supply chain security 
DP World has been certified as a partner in the Customs-Trade Partnership Against Terrorism (C‑TPAT) initiative by US Customs and Border Protection – to date, the only international port operator to have achieved this recognition. This certification is primarily based on DP World's commitment to the independently audited international ISO 28000 security standards. DP World was the first global maritime terminal operator to achieve ISO 28000 supply chain security certification and is rolling out the standard to all its terminals.

Counter piracy 
In June 2012, in partnership with the UAE Ministry of Foreign Affairs, DP World convened the second high-level, public-private counterpiracy conference, in Dubai. The Washington Post reported "Diplomats and business leaders...are pushing for stronger partnerships between the public and private sectors in combating piracy off the coast of Somalia".

The April 2011 conference was the first time companies rather than governments had contributed financial support to the UN counter-piracy trust fund. The inaugural conference was attended by more than 65 governments and representatives of international organisations, including the United Nations and more than 120 leaders from maritime industry related companies.

Berbera operations

In 2016 a US$442 million agreement was reached between DP World and the government of Somaliland. The deal involves enhancing and operating the regional trade and logistics hub at the Port of Berbera. The project, which will be phased in, will also involve the setting up of a free zone.

On 1 March 2018, Ethiopia became a major shareholder following an agreement with DP World and the Somaliland Port Authority. DP World holds a 51% stake in the project, Somaliland 30% and Ethiopia the remaining 19%. As part of the agreement, the government of Ethiopia will invest in infrastructure to develop the Berbera Corridor as a trade gateway for the inland country, which is one of the fastest growing countries in the world. There are also plans to construct an additional berth at the Port of Berbera, in line with the Berbera master plan, which DP World has started implementing, while adding new equipment to further improve efficiencies and productivity of the port.

The agreement comes as part of a larger government-to-government Memorandum of understanding between Government of the United Arab Emirates and the Government of Somaliland to further strengthen their strategic ties. Somalia's attempts to obstruct and block the deal were frustrated and failed to stop the project from commencing.

DP World Dakar 
On 3 January 2022, construction began on the US$1.13 billion deep-water port at Ndayane, around 50 km (31 miles) south of the Senegalese capital Dakar, when President Macky Sall laid the foundation stone. DP World Dakar is a joint venture between DP World and the Port Authority of Dakar. The first phase of the project will include 840 metres of quay and a 5 kilometres marine channel designed to handle 366-metre vessels. The second phase will add 410 metres of container quay and further dredging to handle 400-metre vessels.

Sport sponsorship 
DP World sponsored the European Tour's season ending DP World Tour Championship, Dubai, played at Jumeirah Golf Estates. DP World also supported the Hong Kong Open and the BMW PGA Championship at Wentworth Club. In November 2021, DP World invested US$400 million in the European Tour to become the tour's new title sponsor, with the tour being renamed as the DP World Tour.

In the 2020 Formula One Season, DP World and Renault F1 Team have signed an agreement making DP World the Global Logistics Partner and title sponsor for Renault, renaming the team as Renault DP World F1 Team.

In the 2020 season of the Indian Premier League, DP World is the Global Logistics Partner for the Royal Challengers Bangalore team.

DP World sponsored the yacht Maiden on her world tour 2021–24.

Dubai Turf is also sponsored by DP World in 2022.

DP World was also the title sponsor for 2022 Asia Cup.

DP World has signed a deal to become the title sponsor of the ILT20 for five years.

DP World announced a partnership agreement with McLaren in February 2023. DP World will also become the lead partner of McLaren APEX, McLaren’s off-track business-to-business event programme, promoting influential collaborations across McLaren’s expansive partner network and beyond.

References

External links
DP World – Global
BBC story on takeover of P&O
SourceWatch article on DP World

 
Dubai World
Transport companies established in 1999
Companies based in Dubai
Port companies of the United Arab Emirates
Transport operators of the United Kingdom
Multinational companies headquartered in the United Arab Emirates
Emirati companies established in 1999
Companies listed on Nasdaq Dubai